Aleksandra Arkadyevna Pasynkova (born April 14, 1987) is a  volleyball player from Russia. She plays for Uralochka-NTMK (since 2002).

Clubs
 Dinamo-Yantar Kaliningrad (2002–2003)
 Uralochka-NTMK Ekaterinburg (2003–2014)
 Dinamo Krasnodar (2014–2016)
 Sakhalin Yuzhno-Sakhalinsk (2016–2017)
 Proton Saratov (2017–2018)
 Dynamo Kazan (2018–present)

Awards

Individuals
 2016 CEV Cup - Best Receiver

Clubs

FIVB Club World Championship
  Zurich 2015 - with Dinamo Krasnodar

CEV Cup
  2008/2009 - with Uralochka-NTMK Ekaterinburg
  2013/2014 - with Uralochka-NTMK Ekaterinburg
  2014/2015 - with Dinamo Krasnodar
  2015/2016 - with Dinamo Krasnodar

National Championships
 2003/2004  Russian Championship, with Uralochka-NTMK Ekaterinburg
 2004/2005  Russian Championship, with Uralochka-NTMK Ekaterinburg
 2007/2008  Russian Championship, with Uralochka-NTMK Ekaterinburg
 2008/2009  Russian Championship, with Uralochka-NTMK Ekaterinburg
 2011/2012  Russian Championship, with Uralochka-NTMK Ekaterinburg
 2014/2015  Russian Cup, with Dinamo Krasnodar
 2015/2016  Russian Cup, with Dinamo Krasnodar
 2015/2016  Russian Championship, with Dinamo Krasnodar

National team

Senior team
 2005  Boris Yeltsin Cup
 2008  Boris Yeltsin Cup
 2009  Boris Yeltsin Cup
 2009  FIVB World Grand Prix
 2013  Montreux Volley Masters
 2013  Boris Yeltsin Cup
 2013  Universiade
 2013  CEV European Championship
 2014  Boris Yeltsin Cup
 2014  FIVB World Grand Prix
 2015  Boris Yeltsin Cup
 2015  FIVB World Grand Prix
 2015  CEV European Championship

References

Official website of Uralochka.  Aleksandra Pasynkova profile 

1987 births
Living people
Russian women's volleyball players
Volleyball players at the 2008 Summer Olympics
Olympic volleyball players of Russia
Sportspeople from Yekaterinburg
Universiade medalists in volleyball
Universiade gold medalists for Russia
Medalists at the 2013 Summer Universiade
20th-century Russian women
21st-century Russian women